Jaime González Airport  is an international airport that serves Cienfuegos, a city on the southern coast of Cuba, and capital of the province of Cienfuegos.

Facilities

Airlines and destinations

There are currently no scheduled flights, due to the suspension of all flights operated by Sunwing Airlines during the COVID-19 pandemic.

Cienfuegos Air Base
The airport is an inactive Cuban Revolutionary Armed Forces air base:
 3684 Helicopter Regiment - Mil Mi-8TB transport helicopters, Mil Mi-24D attack/transport helicopter and Mil Mi-35 helicopter gunship/transport

History of Cienfuegos Air Base

World War II 
During the war the base was set up to use a non-descript number for postal operations. They used the Fleet Post Office, Atlantic located in New York, New York with the address: 317 FPO NY.

The US Navy code word for Cienfuegos during the war was ODOP.

References

External links

cienfuegos.airportcuba.net Complete information about Jaime González airport
 
 

Airports in Cuba
Buildings and structures in Cienfuegos
Military history of Cuba